"My Mistake" is a 1977 song by New Zealand art rock group Split Enz. It was released in September 1977 as the lead single from their studio album Dizrythmia.

"My Mistake" was the first Split Enz song to achieve a top 20 chart position, peaking at #15 in Australia and #21 in the band's native New Zealand.

Music video
The music video for "My Mistake" has a cabaret style. It begins with most of the group in front of a stage playing the music in a dimly lit amphitheatre. Tim Finn walks onto stage and begins to sing. The stage lights up eventually and all the band members can be seen. Throughout the video, Tim Finn performs 'magic tricks' assisted by editing (such as disappearing and appearing items). As is heard on the album version of the song, Finn then scats along with the trumpet solo performed by band member Robert Gillies. At the end of the video, while playing, Gillies' trumpet disappears, and Eddie Rayner's piano disappears as he's playing it.

Track listing

UK 12" vinyl
Side A
"My Mistake" - 2:56
"Crosswords" - 3:21
Side B
"The Woman Who Loves You" - 6:46

Standard 7" vinyl
"My Mistake" - 2:40
"Crosswords" - 3:21

Cover versions
The Panda Band covered the song in 2006 on Australian youth radio station Triple J's Like a Version segment.

Personnel
All members of the performing personnel feature in the music video for "My Mistake".
 Tim Finn - vocals
 Neil Finn - backing vocals, guitars
 Eddie Rayner - piano
 Noel Crombie -  percussion
 Robert Gillies - trumpet
 Malcolm Green - drums
 Nigel Griggs - bass

Charts

References

Split Enz songs
1977 singles
Songs written by Tim Finn
1977 songs
Mushroom Records singles
Song recordings produced by Geoff Emerick